Robert "Bobby" Henline (born September 3, 1971) is an American stand-up comedian, motivational speaker, and former U.S. Army soldier. He began his career in comedy in 2009 when he performed at an open mic night at the Comedy Store in Los Angeles. He has since gone on to perform comedy and give motivational talks internationally, and has featured in several movies and documentaries.

Career

Military career
Henline enlisted in the  United States Army in 1989 at 17 years of age. After completing basic training he served in the Gulf War and was Honorably Discharged from service in 1992. Following the September 11 attacks of 2001, Henline re-enlisted into the Army and served 3 tours during the Iraq War. On his 3rd tour he was part of the 82nd Airborne Division and during a convoy transporting soldiers and supplies the Humvee Henline was riding in hit an IED. The four other soldiers he was riding with were all killed and Henline was set ablaze in the explosion. He suffered severe burns over 40 percent of his body with his head and face being burned down to the skull. Henline was put into a medically induced coma and transported to Brooke Army Medical Center in San Antonio, Texas. He awakened after two weeks, and underwent 6 months of treatment. Currently, Henline has undergone 48 surgeries including multiple skin grafts and reconstructions.

Comedy career
While hospitalized Henline would often use humor as a means of dealing with his extraordinary circumstances. As his treatment was ending, his occupational therapist suggested that he attend an open mic at the Comedy Store. In August 2009, Henline made his debut and from there he would do open mics 3 times a week. He would be contacted by a talent agency in L.A. which would lead him to a part in the Showtime documentary "Comedy Warriors: Healing Through Humor". He would go on to perform at events and comedy clubs across the nation including such venues as Hollywood Improv and Laugh Factory.

Motivational speaking
After his recovery Henline started traveling and speaking to a wide range of audiences, especially injured veterans and burn victims. He helped found the Bravo748 Military and Law Enforcement Speakers Bureau and travels around the world with them to do speaking engagements. 
Henline started the charity organization Forging Forward, The Bobby Henline Foundation with the goal of helping military personnel and first-responders and their families deal with the injuries and traumas that can occur in that work.

Filmography

Film

Television

Awards and nominations

References

External links 

 
 
 

 

1971 births
American stand-up comedians
American male comedians
American motivational speakers
United States Army personnel of the Iraq War
Living people
21st-century American comedians
United States Army non-commissioned officers
Burn survivors
United States Army personnel of the Gulf War